Tension was a Christian straight-edge hardcore punk band that formed in 1993.

History
In 1993, vocalist Mikey Hurley formed Tension, as a side project of his band Endure. Hurley hired Joe Keit of the Murrychesstoes on guitars and Chris Michaelis on drums. Soon thereafter, Nick Dominguez of Endure joined the band on bass guitar, which completed the first official lineup. Shortly after the band's first phone call together, the band demoed out six songs and recorded them two weeks later in studio. The songs became Tension's first release, In Our Time, which came out shortly after being recorded.

In 1993, Dominguez left the band to join Strongarm and was replaced by Ray Rodriguez. The band released The Sickness of our Age EP in 1994, which is considered to be their best release. Michaelis left the band shortly thereafter, being replaced by Eric Leon, which was when the band reached its peak. In 1995, the band went on tour with Uplipht and Strongarm, and played around 25-30 shows. Tension was then asked to partake in a 4-way split 7-inch with Culture, Roosevelt and After All on Intention Records but the release fell through.

Leon was soon thereafter asked to leave for reasons not released and was replaced by Mike McDermit. He performed on the band's debut album, Agent of the People. Tension signed to Uprising Records and released Agent of the People and re-released Sickness of Our Age.

Tension is looked at as classic or legendary in the Florida hardcore scene. The band also had various connections with several other well-known Florida bands, such as New Found Glory, Endure, Strongarm, Shai Hulud, and Further Seems Forever.

The band had several short term members, which included Matt Fox (Shai Hulud), Chad Gilbert (New Found Glory), Ray Souza (LOAD), Kenny Fontaine (Kenny Steel), and John Wylie (Where Fear and Weapons Meet). The band played shows with Earth Crisis, Hatebreed, Strife, Shelter, and Marilyn Manson.

In 2017, Mikey Hurley, the band's original member, died on July 18 at the age of 45. It was reported that he committed suicide. His death was mourned by his bandmates and his friends.

Members

Discography

References

Christian hardcore musical groups
Christian rock groups from Florida
Musical groups established in 1993
Musical groups disestablished in 1997